The Budapest Times is an English-language newspaper reporting on events in Hungary. The paper is published weekly and is owned by Budapest-Zeitung Kft.

See also
 List of newspapers in Hungary

References

External links
Official website

Newspapers published in Budapest
Weekly newspapers published in Hungary
English-language press in Hungary
English-language newspapers published in Europe